Risqki Putra Utomo (born 5 November 1998) is an Indonesian professional footballer who plays as a forward for Liga 2 club Persela Lamongan.

Club career

Persela Lamongan
He was signed for Persela Lamongan to play in Liga 1 in the 2021 season. Risqki made his first-team debut on 10 September 2021 in a match against Persipura Jayapura at the Wibawa Mukti Stadium, Cikarang.

PSG Pati (loan)
He was signed for PSG Pati to play in Liga 2 in the 2020 season. This season was suspended on 27 March 2020 due to the COVID-19 pandemic. The season was abandoned and was declared void on 20 January 2021.

Career statistics

Club

Notes

References

External links
 Risqki Putra Utomo at Soccerway
 Risqki Putra Utomo at Liga Indonesia

1998 births
Living people
Indonesian footballers
Persela Lamongan players
Association football forwards
People from Lamongan Regency
Sportspeople from East Java